Serbia participated in the Junior Eurovision Song Contest 2016 which took place on 20 November 2016, in Valletta, Malta. Radio Television of Serbia (RTS) was responsible for organising their entry for the contest. Dunja Jeličić was internally selected to represent Serbia with the song "U la la la".

Background

Before Junior Eurovision
The Serbian broadcaster announced on 14 September 2016, that they would be participating at the contest to be held in Valletta, Malta. Ot 6 October 2016, it was announced that Dunja Jeličić would be representing the country in Valletta with the song "U la la la". Jeličić had previously appeared in the 2015 contest as the Serbian spokesperson.

Artist and song information

Dunja Jeličić
Dunja Jeličić was born in Belgrade on 11 November 2003.

Dunja showed interest in music as a child, singing and dancing to every tone and rhythm of music that she heard. At the age of six she became a member of the children’s choir, Čarolija, and performed many concerts as a soloist. She was also a contestant in the competition Prvi srpski talenat (First Talents of Serbia).

In 2014, Dunja made it to the semi-finals of the big talent show for children, Pinkove zvezdice. She won the love of the audience with her flourishing vocals and sincerity. She is now in seventh grade of elementary school and also goes to music school where she is learning to play the piano.

More recently Dunja has taken part in the Čarolija music festival and at the annual Zlatna Sirena competition she won several first places in different categories and genres. Dunja enjoys different styles of music including pop, rock, and r’n’b. Her favourite performers include Beyoncé and Ariana Grande.

Dunja is very creative and outside of music Dunja she likes art and swimming. Music and acting are talents that she possesses and which she aspires to continue developing in the future. She is currently engaged in preparing the musical based on the life of Nikola Tesla; Tesla: The Secret of Electropy (Tesla: Tajna Elektropije) where she will be playing one of the leading roles.

U La La La

At Junior Eurovision
During the opening ceremony and the running order draw which took place on 14 November 2016, Serbia was drawn to perform twelfth on 20 November 2016, following Italy and preceding Israel.

Final

Voting
During the press conference for the Junior Eurovision Song Contest 2016, held in Stockholm, the Reference Group announced several changes to the voting format for the 2016 contest. Previously, points had been awarded based on a combination of 50% National juries and 50% televoting, with one more set of points also given out by a 'Kids' Jury'. For the first time since the inauguration of the contest the voting procedure will not include a public televote. Following these results, three expert jurors will also announce their points from 1-8, 10, and 12. These professional jurors are: Christer Björkman, Mads Grimstad, and Jedward.

References

Junior Eurovision Song Contest
Serbia
2016